Glycobiarsol (trade name Milibis) is an antiprotozoal agent that has been used in humans as well as in dogs.

References

Antiprotozoal agents
Organoarsenic compounds
Bismuth compounds
Acetanilides